The 1981 Kansas State Wildcats football team represented Kansas State University in the 1981 NCAA Division I-A football season.  The team's head football coach was Jim Dickey.  The Wildcats played their home games in KSU Stadium.  1981 saw the wildcats finish with a record of 2–9, and a 1–6 record in Big Eight Conference play.

Schedule

Roster

References

Kansas State
Kansas State Wildcats football seasons
Kansas State Wildcats football